The St. Joe National Forest is a U.S. National Forest located in the Idaho panhandle and is one of three forests that are aggregated into the Idaho Panhandle National Forests (the other two are the Coeur d'Alene and Kaniksu  National Forests). In descending order of land area St. Joe National Forest is located in parts of Shoshone, Latah, Clearwater, and Benewah counties.

Description
St. Joe is home to a numerous variety of mammalian species including white-tailed deer, mule deer, raccoon, elk, moose, black bear, grizzly bear, coyote, skunk, timber wolf, cougar, marten, beaver, bobcat, river otter, mink, and wolverine. Bird species include wild turkey, grouse, ravens, blue jays, bald eagle, osprey, golden eagle, California quails, and numerous types of owls.

The forest headquarters is located in Coeur d'Alene, Idaho. There are local ranger district offices located in Avery and St. Maries.

References

External links

 St. Joe Ranger District - Idaho Panhandle National Forests

National Forests of Idaho
Protected areas of Shoshone County, Idaho
Protected areas of Latah County, Idaho
Protected areas of Clearwater County, Idaho
Protected areas of Benewah County, Idaho
Idaho Panhandle National Forest
Protected areas established in 1908
1908 establishments in Idaho